The 2011 Relentless International North West 200 was the 72nd running of the road racing event and took place on Saturday 21 May 2011 at the circuit, known as "The Triangle", based around the towns of Portstewart, Coleraine and Portrush, in Northern Ireland.  As with 2010, the event featured daytime practice on the Thursday rather than during the evening.  Traditionally only the main NW200 race has been run over six laps, however in 2011 all five events were to be six lap races.  For the first time since 1989 there was no scheduled 125 cc event.

There were significant delays due to a hoax bomb alert and then an extensive oil spill on the track together with bad weather caused racing to be cancelled after the completion of only one race.

Results
The first race of the day was a switch from the Superbike's to the less powerful Supersport's due to wet conditions. The race was also reduced from six to five laps with two sighting laps. The race was won by Alastair Seeley after a last lap battle with Cameron Donald. The paddock was evacuated  after the race because of a bomb hoax. The second delayed race of the day was for the Superbike race. However, due to deteriorated conditions a number of riders, including the pole sitter Michael Rutter, decided not to take part. Seeley was leading Michael Dunlop when the race was stopped after one lap due to an oil split. The event was abandon at 17:20 BST.

Practice

Practice Times & Leaderboard Race 2 & 5 – 1000cc Superbike class

Race Results

Race 1; 600cc Supersport Race final standings 
Saturday 21 May 2011 5 laps – 44.71 miles

Fastest Lap: Alastair Seeley – Suzuki, 4 minutes, 55.835 seconds  109.155 mph on lap 5

See also
North West 200 – History and results from the event

References

External links
https://web.archive.org/web/20070309173345/http://www.northwest200.org/ The Official North 200 Website
http://www.bbc.co.uk/northernireland/nw200/ BBC North West 200 Website

2011
North West 200
Sport in County Londonderry
Sport in County Antrim
2011 in Northern Ireland sport
Coleraine
Motorsport in Northern Ireland
North
May 2011 sports events in the United Kingdom